Nairn Golf Club is a golf course in Nairn, Scotland.

The Nairn Golf Club is noted for hosting the 1999 Walker Cup, 2004 Jacques Léglise Trophy, 2012 Curtis Cup, and the 2021 Amateur Championship.

References

External links

Golf clubs and courses in Highland (council area)
Walker Cup venues
Curtis Cup venues
Nairn
Organisations based in Highland (council area)